The red-crested cardinal (Paroaria coronata) is a songbird, the species belonging to the family of  tanagers (Thraupidae). Notwithstanding its similar name, this bird is not closely related to the true cardinal family (Cardinalidae). It is sometimes known as the Brazilian cardinal.

Etymology
The genus name Paroaria comes from the Tupí people and can be translated as “small red, yellow, and gray bird“, while the Latin species name coronata means crowned.

Distribution
This species can be found mainly in northern Argentina, Bolivia, Paraguay, Uruguay, Brazil's Rio Grande do Sul and southern part of the Pantanal.

It has also been introduced to Hawaii, Puerto Rico and Chile. In Brazil, it has been introduced to various places outside its historical range, as in the Tietê Ecological Park in São Paulo.

Habitat
It often occurs close to rivers, marshes and lakes.

Description
Paroaria coronata is a medium-sized species showing a red head, with a red bib and a short red crest that the bird raises when excited. Belly, breast and undertail are white, with a gray back, wings, and tail. Wing coverts are gray, but the primaries, secondaries, and rectrices show a darker gray. Juveniles are similar to the adults, but they show a dull brownish orange head and bib.

This species is very similar to a close relative, the red-cowled cardinal (P. dominicana). It is also similar to the yellow-billed cardinal (P. capitata), but the latter bird has a black throat, darker upper parts and a bright yellow bill.

Biology
This species mainly feed on seeds (of Chloris virgata, Eleusine tristachya, Setaria parviflora and Spergula villosa), fruits (of Celtis tala, Grabowskia duplicata, Holmbergia tweedii, Morus alba, and Sapium haematospermum), insects and small arthropods, generally searched for on the ground in pairs or small groups. Average lifespan is about 3.8 years.

Gallery

References

External links
Red-crested cardinal videos on the Internet Bird Collection
Stamps (for Argentina, Brazil, Uruguay) with range map
Red-crested cardinal photo gallery VIREO

Paroaria
Birds of Argentina
Birds of Paraguay
Birds of Bolivia
Birds of Uruguay
Birds of the Pantanal
Birds described in 1776
Taxonomy articles created by Polbot
Articles containing video clips